Goldman Glacier is a glacier  east of Marr Glacier, flowing north from the Kukri Hills into Taylor Valley in Victoria Land, Antarctica. It was named by the Advisory Committee on Antarctic Names for United States Antarctic Research Program biologist Charles R. Goldman, who made studies in the area in the 1962–63 season.

References

Glaciers of McMurdo Dry Valleys